Ralph Blaylock "Scotty" Bowman (June 20, 1911 in Winnipeg, Manitoba – October 17, 1990) was a Canadian ice hockey player. Bowman played seven seasons in the National Hockey League for the Ottawa Senators, St. Louis Eagles and Detroit Red Wings.

On November 13, 1934, Bowman, then playing for the St. Louis Eagles, scored the first penalty shot goal in NHL history.

Career statistics

Regular season and playoffs

Awards and achievements
 Stanley Cup Championships (1936 & 1937)
 Honoured Member of the Manitoba Hockey Hall of Fame

References

External links

Ralph Bowman's biography at Manitoba Hockey Hall of Fame

1911 births
1990 deaths
Canadian ice hockey defencemen
Detroit Red Wings players
Hershey Bears players
Indianapolis Capitals players
Ottawa Senators (1917) players
Philadelphia Rockets players
Pittsburgh Hornets players
St. Louis Eagles players
Ice hockey people from Winnipeg
Stanley Cup champions
Washington Lions players
Canadian expatriate ice hockey players in the United States